Seyqalan (also Romanized as Şeyqalān) is a village in Kasma Rural District, in the Central District of Sowme'eh Sara County, Gilan Province, Iran. At the 2006 census, its population was 228, in 61 families.

References 

Populated places in Sowme'eh Sara County